The Big 6 Brass Band is a New Orleans brass band. The group was founded in 2017 by members and alumni of some of the city's top brass bands including the Rebirth Brass Band, Hot 8 Brass Band, Stooges Brass Band, and To Be Continued Brass Band. Soon after their founding in 2017, the Big 6 became the most popular band on the streets, playing in almost every second line of the 2018–2019 season.

Discography
In 2019, they released their debut album titled "Big Six." In Offbeat Magazine's review of the album, the band was heralded as "the sound of New Orleans streets today."

"Big Six" by Big 6 Brass Band

References

Brass bands from New Orleans
Musical groups established in 2017
2017 establishments in Louisiana